Lynn Davis Compton (December 31, 1921 – February 25, 2012), known as  Buck Compton, was an American jurist, police officer, and soldier. In his legal career, he served as a prosecutor and California Court of Appeal judge, and is most notable as having been the lead prosecutor in Sirhan Sirhan's trial for the assassination of Robert F. Kennedy. Previously, he served with the Los Angeles Police Department. During World War II, he was a commissioned officer with E Company, 2nd Battalion, 506th Parachute Infantry Regiment, in the 101st Airborne Division of the United States Army. Compton was portrayed in the HBO miniseries Band of Brothers by Neal McDonough.

Early life
Compton was born in Los Angeles, California. Early on, he gave himself the nickname "Buck" due to feeling that Lynn was a name better suited to a girl. His mother Ethel worked for movie studios and a young Compton worked as an extra in films. He was thrown off the set of Modern Times after angering the film's star Charlie Chaplin. He was an athlete at the University of California, Los Angeles (UCLA), being named an all-conference catcher and All-American selection in 1942. Among his baseball teammates was Jackie Robinson. Compton was later inducted into the UCLA Baseball Hall of Fame. He majored in physical education, with a minor in education. He joined the Phi Kappa Psi Fraternity in 1940. He also played with the UCLA football team in the 1943 Rose Bowl game on January 1, 1943.

Military service
At UCLA, Compton participated in ROTC under Cadet Commander John Singlaub. In December 1943, he joined the Army and was assigned to E Company, 2nd Battalion, 506th Parachute Infantry Regiment in the 101st Airborne Division before Operation Overlord. During the company's action at Brécourt Manor, Compton and others, under the leadership of Lieutenant Richard Winters, assaulted a German battery of four 105 mm howitzers firing on Utah Beach, disabling the guns and routing the enemy. Compton was awarded the Silver Star for his action in disabling the guns. Episode two ("Day of Days") of the HBO miniseries Band of Brothers depicts this assault. During the battle, he threw a grenade that was said to have had no arc and hit the German soldier on the back of the helmet.

Later in 1944, Compton was shot through the buttocks while participating in Operation Market Garden, the Allies' ill-fated attempt to seize a number of bridges in the Netherlands and cross the Rhine River into Germany. The bullet traveled sideways, through one side of the buttocks and out the other side. After a partial recovery, he returned to E Company in time for the siege in the frozen Ardennes that became known as the Battle of the Bulge.

Compton was evacuated for severe trench foot. Stephen E. Ambrose concluded that Compton had been "unnerved" by witnessing the carnage involving two of his closest friends, Joe Toye and William Guarnere. Compton wrote in his autobiography, "...although I was affected by the horrors of Bastogne, I do not believe I was clinically shell shocked, as the series portrays me. In real life, while I was hollering for the medic, trying to figure out what to do, I remember two distinct thoughts: How are we going to help the wounded guys?...Maybe this is the time the Germans are really going to get us all."

In January 1945, Compton left E Company with an honorable discharge. He returned on VE Day for the company's annual baseball game.

In 1947, he joined the Air Force Reserve, serving in the Office of Special Investigations and eventually Judge Advocate General Corps before retiring as a lieutenant colonel in 1970.

Medals and decorations (Army only)

Later years
In 1946 he turned down an offer to play minor league baseball, choosing instead to concentrate on a career in law. Compton married Donna Newman in October 1947 and the couple adopted two children. He attended Loyola Law School in Los Angeles, joined the Los Angeles Police Department in 1946 and became a detective in the Central Burglary Division. He left the LAPD for the District Attorney's office in 1951 as a deputy district attorney, and was promoted in 1964 to chief deputy district attorney.

During his time with the District Attorney's office, he successfully prosecuted Sirhan Sirhan for the murder of Robert F. Kennedy. In 1970, Governor Ronald Reagan appointed him an associate justice of the California Court of Appeal. He retired from the bench in 1990 and resided in the state of Washington until his death.

Compton's memoirs, entitled Call of Duty: My Life before, during and after the Band of Brothers and written with Marcus Brotherton, were published by Berkeley Publishing on May 6, 2008. A celebration of Compton's 90th birthday was held in January 2012 with nearly 200 in attendance including Band of Brothers actors Michael Cudlitz, James Madio, Neal McDonough, and Richard Speight, Jr. McDonough developed a friendship with Compton while making the miniseries and kept in touch afterwards. McDonough's son Morgan is nicknamed "Little Buck" in honor of Compton.

Failing health and death
In January 2012 Compton suffered a heart attack. On February 25, 2012, he died at a daughter's home in Burlington, Washington. His wife Donna having died previously in 1994, Compton was survived by two daughters and four grandchildren.

See also

References

Bibliography

External links

 Photos of Buck Compton & the Band of Brothers' 2009 visit with Prince Charles
 Interview with Compton from World War II Magazine

1921 births
2012 deaths
American football offensive linemen
United States Army personnel of World War II
American prosecutors
Band of Brothers characters
Judges of the California Courts of Appeal
Los Angeles Police Department officers
Loyola Law School alumni
Lawyers from Los Angeles
Recipients of the Silver Star
UCLA Bruins football players
United States Army officers
University of California, Los Angeles alumni
Writers from California
People from Burlington, Washington
20th-century American judges
20th-century American lawyers
Military personnel from California